1615 Poydras, also known as DXC Technology Center, and formerly known as the Freeport McMoRan building, is a 23-story, -tall skyscraper office building. It is located at 1615 Poydras Street, in the Central Business District of New Orleans, Louisiana.

See also
 List of tallest buildings in New Orleans
 Freeport-McMoRan

External links
 1615 Poydras official website

Skyscraper office buildings in New Orleans

Office buildings completed in 1984
HOK (firm) buildings